The Rural Municipality of Frontier No. 19 is a rural municipality (RM) in the Canadian province of Saskatchewan within Census Division No. 4 and  Division No. 3. Located in the southwest portion of the province, it is adjacent to the United States border, neighbouring Blaine County in Montana.

History 
The RM of Frontier No. 19 incorporated as a rural municipality on January 1, 1913. The name of the RM originated in 1912, reflecting its position along the United States boundary. The first Frontier post office, opened 1917, was just four miles north of the border. The Village of Frontier took its name from the surrounding RM in 1923.

Geography

Communities and localities 
The following urban municipalities are surrounded by the RM.

Villages
Frontier

The following unincorporated communities are within the RM.

Localities
Claydon
Divide
Loomis
Staynor Hall

Demographics 

Government 
The RM of Frontier No. 19 is governed by an elected municipal council and an appointed administrator that meets on the second Tuesday of every month. The reeve of the RM is Troy Heggestad while its administrator is Barb Webber. The RM's office is located in Frontier.

Transportation

See also
List of rural municipalities in Saskatchewan
Old Man on His Back Prairie and Heritage Conservation Area

References 

Frontier
Division No. 4, Saskatchewan